The 2021–22 Charlotte 49ers men's basketball team represented the University of North Carolina at Charlotte during the 2021–22 NCAA Division I men's basketball season. The team were led by fourth-year head coach Ron Sanchez, and played their home games at Dale F. Halton Arena in Charlotte, North Carolina as members of Conference USA.

Previous season
The 49ers finished the 2020–21 season 9–16, 5–11 in C-USA play to finish in fifth place in East Division. They lost in the second round of the C-USA tournament to UTSA.

Offseason

Departures

Incoming transfers

2021 recruiting class

2022 Recruiting class

Roster

Schedule and results

|-
!colspan=9 style=| Exhibition

|-
!colspan=9 style=| Non-conference regular season

|-
!colspan=9 style=| Conference USA regular season

|-
!colspan=9 style=| Conference USA tournament

Source

See also
 2021–22 Charlotte 49ers women's basketball team

References

Charlotte 49ers men's basketball seasons
Charlotte 49ers
Charlotte 49ers men's basketball
Charlotte 49ers men's basketball